Bailey Gaither (born January 11, 1997) is an American football wide receiver for the Pittsburgh Maulers of the United States Football League (USFL). He played college football at San Jose State.

College career
After graduating high school, Gaither enrolled at San Jose State, where in his first year he redshirted. After being a redshirt throughout the 2015 season, Gaither started one game in 2016, making 4 receptions for 43 yards and 1 touchdown. He also returned 7 kickoffs for 128 yards. In the 2017 season, Gaither started 4 of 9 games. He recorded 22 catches for 320 yards and 4 touchdowns. He also returned 13 kicks for 256 yards and blocked a punt. In the 2018 season, Gaither started 3 of 4 games. His season was cut short by a torn ACL. He caught 16 for 327 yards and 3 touchdowns. He had 3 kick returns for 50 yards and had 1 punt return for 9 yards. Gaither had his best college season in 2019. He started all 12 games and caught 52 passes for 812 yards and 6 touchdowns. He also recorded 1 punt return for 10 yards and had a blocked punt that was featured on ESPN Sports Center's top "Plays of the Day" (10/26). At the end of the year he earned an Honorable Mention for all-Mountain West. In his final college season, Gaither earned a First-team All-Mountain West and his bachelor's degree in communication studies. He started 7 of 7 games in which he caught 41 receptions for 725 yards and 4 touchdowns. He also had 5 punt returns for 37 yards.

Professional career

Green Bay Packers and initial retirement
Gaither signed with the Green Bay Packers as an undrafted free agent shortly after the conclusion of the 2021 NFL Draft. On August 3, 2021 he retired and was placed on reserve/retired list. On August 20, 2021, he was waived from the retired list.

Pittsburgh Maulers
Gaither came out of retirement and was selected in the 14th round of the 2022 USFL Draft by the Pittsburgh Maulers, which reunited him with his former college teammate, Josh Love. Gaither was transferred to the team's inactive roster on May 6, 2022, with an illness. He was moved back to the active roster on May 14.

Baltimore Ravens
On July 27, 2022, Gaither signed with the Baltimore Ravens. He was waived on August 23.

New York Giants
On August 24, 2022, Gaither was claimed off waivers by the New York Giants. He was waived the next day after failing his physical.

Baltimore Ravens (second stint)
On October 5, 2022, Gaither re-signed with the Baltimore Ravens, joining their practice squad, but was released five days later.

Pittsburgh Maulers (second stint)
Gaither re-signed with the Pittsburgh Maulers on January 24, 2023.

References

Further reading
 
 
 

1997 births
Living people
Players of American football from California
People from Paso Robles, California
American football wide receivers
San Jose State Spartans football players
Green Bay Packers players
Pittsburgh Maulers (2022) players
Baltimore Ravens players
New York Giants players